AF Borgen, originally known as Akademiska Föreningens Stora Sal, is the house of The Academic Society in Lund, Sweden, constructed in 1848, situated opposite the University Main Building in Lundagård. AF Borgen houses a great hall, which has held concerts by artists such as Depeche Mode, Phil Lynott, Accept and Uriah Heep.

References

Lund University
Public universities
Buildings and structures in Lund
Tourist attractions in Lund